Van Dyke and Harper Music is the second studio album by American horrorcore rapper King Gordy. The record was released in 2007 via Morbid Music LLC.

In the booklet of the CD it says that this album is dedicated to Cordaro "Cord" Larkins (1986–2006) and Deshaun "Proof" Holten (1973–2006).

Track listing

Personnel
1st Born – producer on track 13 for Iron Fist Records
Astray – producer on tracks 3, 4, 5, 6, 9, 10, 11, 12, 14, 15, 17
Brian Berryman – mixing, recording
C&O Entertainment – booking
Eric Clapton – producer on track 1
Frederick Beauregard – producer on track 18 for Beats At Will productions
Geno – producer on tracks 2 and 7 for Cognac Grooves productions
George Tasseff – engineering
Marvin "Marvwon" Oneal – producer on tracks 8 and 16 for Silent Riot productions
Olaf Johnson – executive production and management
Rufus Arthur Johnson – performer on track 13
Shabazz Ford - performer on track 16
Shaphan "Maestro" Williams – producer on track 8 for Silent Riot productions
Tony Campana – mixing, recording
Waverly W. Alford III – songwriter, primary artist, performer
Zamir productions – artwork and design

References

2007 albums
King Gordy albums